At least two warships of Japan have borne the name Haguro:

 , was a  launched in 1928 and sunk in 1945
 , is a  launched in 2019

Japanese Navy ship names